Taihe Subdistrict is a subdistrict under the administration of Shehong, Sichuan, China. , it administers 14 residential neighborhoods and one village:
Neighborhoods
Yashu Street Community
Sanyuangong Community
Desheng Street Community
Shuihugong Community
Baohe Community
Huangsanghao Community
Jifang Street Community
Jianshe Community
Hejiaqiao Community
Fonan Community
Liangmaoshan Community
Wangyemiao Community
Nanjinggou Community
Guixian Community

Village
Bailianshan Village

References 

Township-level divisions of Sichuan
Shehong County